Mount Stancliff is a peak 3 nautical miles (6 km) northeast of Saunders Mountain on the south side of Crevasse Valley Glacier, in the Ford Ranges of Marie Byrd Land. Discovered by a sledging party of the Byrd Antarctic Expedition in November 1934, and named for Olin D. Stancliff, a member of that party.

Mountains of Marie Byrd Land